The Providencia skink (Marisora pergravis) is a species of skink found on Providencia.

References

Marisora
Reptiles described in 1921
Taxa named by Thomas Barbour